Na Poi is an album by Nigerian Afrobeat composer, bandleader, and multi-instrumentalist Fela Kuti recorded in Lagos in 1971 and originally released on the Nigerian EMI label.

Reception

The Allmusic review awarded the album 4 stars commenting "In essence, the track is a sexual guide set to music. As such, it features both spoken narration as well as sung lyrics. 'Na Poi' rhythms churn and grind through several notable movements—including a spirited percussion section and several tight horn arrangements. These hark back to the same type of perpetual funk that became the cornerstone of Parliament and Funkadelic. Initially, the repercussions of such blatant sexuality resulted in the track being banned by the Nigerian Broadcasting Company".

Track listing
All compositions by Fela Kuti 
 "Na Poi (Part 1)" - 16:20  
 "Na Poi (Part 2)" - 9:00  
 "You No Go Die ... Unless" - 7:35

References

Fela Kuti albums
1971 albums
Afrobeat albums
EMI Records albums